Jeff Carson is the debut album by the American country music artist of the same name. It was released in 1995 on MCG/Curb Records, and features five singles: "Yeah Buddy," "Not on Your Love", "The Car", "Holdin' onto Somethin'", and "That Last Mile". "Not on Your Love" was a Number One hit on the Billboard Hot Country Singles & Tracks (now Hot Country Songs) charts in mid-1995, while "The Car" and "Holdin' on to Something" were both Top Ten hits in 1996.

"Holdin' Onto Somethin'" was also recorded by John Michael Montgomery on his self-titled album, while "If I Ain't Got You" was also recorded by Marty Stuart on his 1995 album The Marty Party Hit Pack.

Track listing

Personnel

 Jeff Carson – lead vocals, background vocals, harmonica
 John Catchings – cello
 J. T. Corenflos – electric guitar
 Chad Cromwell – drums
 Connie Ellisor – violin
 Larry Franklin – fiddle
 Paul Franklin – pedal steel guitar
 Rob Hajacos – fiddle
 Tony Harrell – piano, keyboards
 Terry McMillan – harmonica
 Brent Mason – electric guitar
 Bob Regan – acoustic guitar
 Brent Rowan – electric guitar
 John Wesley Ryles – background vocals
 Michael Spriggs – acoustic guitar
 Cindy Richardson Walker – background vocals
 Hurshel Wiginton – background vocals
 John Willis – electric guitar
 Dennis Wilson – background vocals
 Lonnie Wilson – drums
 Glenn Worf – bass guitar
 Curtis Young – background vocals
 Jonathan Yudkin – fiddle

Chart performance

Singles

References
[ Album listing] at Allmusic

1995 debut albums
Jeff Carson albums
Curb Records albums